Eduardo Bauzá (16 November 1939 – 17 February 2019) was an Argentine lawyer and politician who served as Minister of Health and Minister of the Interior during Carlos Menem's presidency and was later the first Chief of the Cabinet of Ministers. He was member of the Argentine Senate from 5 June 1996 to 10 December 1999.

Education and career
Eduardo Bauzá, a lawyer, graduated from the Universidad de Mendoza. He started his political career in Mendoza Province. He was appointed to his first political office in 1973 in La Rioja Province as the secretary of development, under Governor Carlos Menem. Menem and Bauzá were deposed during the 1976 Argentine coup d'état, and he was detained by the National Reorganization Process a few months later. He was under arrest from May 1976 to April 1977. He resumed his political career in 1982 and helped establish the "Federalismo y liberación" faction within the Justicialist Party (PJ), led by Menem. They ran for the primary elections to the 1983 Argentine general election, and lost to Ítalo Argentino Lúder. Bauzá also ran in the PJ primary election for governor elections and lost to Carlos Motta.

He was elected as a deputy for Mendoza in 1987. He resigned to organize the political campaign of Menem for the 1989 Argentine general election, which Menem won. He was appointed as ministry of interior. He served for six months, and then moved to the Ministry of Health. There was a national scandal during his tenure, the "Smock scandal". The state had bought 500,000 school smocks at a much higher price than usual and only delivered a tenth part, despite the payments in advance. Eduardo Bauzá was acquitted in 2005 by judge María Romilda Servini de Cubría.

Later career and retirement 
After several months, Bauzá served as general secretary of the presidency. The 1994 amendment of the Constitution of Argentina created the office of the Chief of the Cabinet of Ministers; Bauzá was the inaugural holder in 1995. He resigned in 1996, suffering Hepatitis C. He was elected senator, and ended his term in 1999. He retired from politics and returned to the province of Mendoza. 

He organized the political campaign of Menem for the 2003 Argentine general election, Menem won the elections but refused to run in a ballotage election (two-round system) against Santa Cruz governor Néstor Kirchner. At that point, Bauzá retired from internal party politics as well. From then on, he focused on the family business; his great grandfather had established the brand of Bauzá noodles, and the company remains in business.

Illness and death 
In 2004 Bauzá was diagnosed with Alzheimer's disease. His son reported that, although he was severely incapacitated by the disease, he remained lucid during his later years. He died on 17 February 2019, of undisclosed reasons. His family, which includes five sons and seven grandsons, refused to hold a public funeral, and arranged only a private ceremony. He was buried at the Parque de Descanso de Guaymallén cemetery, outside of the city of Mendoza.

References

External links
 Fideos Bauzá  (family business)

1939 births
2019 deaths
Chiefs of Cabinet of Ministers of Argentina
Ministers of Internal Affairs of Argentina
Argentine ministers of health
Justicialist Party politicians
Members of the Argentine Senate for Mendoza
Members of the Argentine Chamber of Deputies elected in Mendoza
People with Alzheimer's disease
Prisoners and detainees of Argentina
People from Mendoza, Argentina
University of Mendoza alumni